Branislav Janković (born 8 February 1992) is a Montenegrin professional footballer who plays as a central midfielder for Kazakhstani club FC Turan and the Montenegro national team.

Club career

Grbalj
Janković started his senior career with Grbalj, making over 100 appearances in the Montenegrin First League between 2009 and 2015. After having spent almost five years with the club, Grbalj's director Nenad Maslovar left the club, and a conflict arose between Janković and Grbalj's club president Marko Carević after Janković chose not to renew his contract whose expiration was set for the summer of 2015. As a result, Carević forbid Janković from playing for the rest of the 2014-15 season. At around this time, Red Star Belgrade participated in negotiations with Grbalj for Janković's transfer, but the talks fell through.

Čukarički
After Janković's contract with OFK Grbalj expired in June 2015, he signed with Serbian side Čukarički on a four-year contract, and received the number 8 shirt. He immediately joined the rest of the team on their summer camp in Austria before their Europa League qualifying campaign. Although Čukarički ended up losing to Gabala in the second qualifying round, Janković played as a starter throughout Čukarički's brief Europa League campaign. On April 23, 2016, Janković scored the goal in Čukarički's 1-0 win against Partizan.

Rudar
On January 30, 2017, Janković signed for Montenegrin side FK Rudar, joining the club on a free transfer until the end of the season. In the course of the half-season, Rudar finished in eighth out of 12 teams in the 2016–17 Montenegrin First League. In addition to starting regularly during the season, Janković played in the subsequent relegation play-off with FK Otrant, which Rudar won 3-1 on aggregate.

Sutjeska
On July 9, 2017, it was announced that Janković signed a one-year contract with Sutjeska Nikšić. On May 12, 2018, he scored Sutjeska's only goal in a 1–1 tie with OFK Grbalj. In the summer of 2018, Janković received an offer from a Romanian team, after which he announced that he intended on leaving Sutjeska. However, in January 2019, he appeared at Sutjeska's winter training camp in an apparent return.

International career
Janković represented his country at Under-19 and Under-21 level. He made his full international debut for Montenegro in a friendly against Slovakia on 23 May 2014.

Statistics

Honours
Sutjeska
Montenegrin First League: 2017–18

References

External links
 
 
 

1992 births
Living people
People from Kotor
Association football midfielders
Montenegrin footballers
Montenegro youth international footballers
Montenegro under-21 international footballers
Montenegro international footballers
OFK Grbalj players
FK Čukarički players
FK Rudar Pljevlja players
FK Sutjeska Nikšić players
Montenegrin First League players
Serbian SuperLiga players
Montenegrin expatriate footballers
Expatriate footballers in Serbia
Montenegrin expatriate sportspeople in Serbia